Isopyrum is a genus of flowering plants of the family Ranunculaceae native to Eurasia. The North American genus Enemion is sometimes treated as part of it.

Species
The list may not be complete or up-to-date. Many of the species formerly placed in Isopyrum are now placed in other genera of the Ranunculaceae, especially Enemion and Dichocarpum. Accepted species include:
 Isopyrum anemonoides Kar. & Kir
 Isopyrum ludlowii Tamura & Lauener
 Isopyrum manshuricum (Komarov) Komarov ex W. T. Wang& Hsiao
 Isopyrum thalictroides L.

Synonyms include:
 Isopyrum arisanense (Hayata) Ohwi = Dichocarpum arisanense (Hayata) W.T.Wang & P.K.Hsiao
 Isopyrum auriculatum Franch. = Dichocarpum auriculatum (Franch.) W.T.Wang & P.K.Hsiao
 Isopyrum dicarpon Miq. = Dichocarpum dicarpon (Miq.) W. T. Wang & Hsiao
 Isopyrum hakonense Maekawa & Tuyama ex Ohwi = Dichocarpum hakonense (Maekawa & Tuyama ex Ohwi) W.T. Wang & Hsiao
 Isopyrum hallii A. Gray=Enemion hallii (A. Gray) J. R. Drumm. & Hutchinson
 Isopyrum leveilleanum Nakai = Semiaquilegia adoxoides (DC.) Makino
 Isopyrum nipponicum Franch. = Dichocarpum nipponicum (Franch.) W. T. Wang & Hsiao
 Isopyrum numajirianum Makino = Dichocarpum numajirianum (Makino) W. T. Wang & Hsiao
 Isopyrum pterigionocaudatum Koidz. = Dichocarpum nipponicum (Franch.) W. T. Wang & Hsiao
 Isopyrum stoloniferum Maxim. = Dichocarpum stoloniferum (Maxim.) W. T. Wang & Hsiao
 Isopyrum trachyspermum Maxim. = Dichocarpum trachyspermum (Maxim.) W. T. Wang & Hsiao
 Isopyrum uniflorum Aitch. & Hemsl. = Paraquilegia uniflora (Aitch. & Hemsl.) J. Drumm. & Hutch.

References
 
 Jepson Manual Treatment
 Tropicos.org - Species of Isopyrum

Ranunculaceae
Ranunculaceae genera